Haider Ali (born 5 July 1994) is a Pakistani cricketer. He made his first-class debut for Zarai Taraqiati Bank Limited in the 2018–19 Quaid-e-Azam Trophy on 25 September 2018.

References

External links
 

1994 births
Living people
Pakistani cricketers
Zarai Taraqiati Bank Limited cricketers
Cricketers from Lahore